Ben Dover, also known as Ben Dover Farm, is a historic home and plantation complex, recognized as a national historic district, located near Manakin-Sabot in Goochland County, Virginia, United States. The district encompasses 13 contributing buildings, 8 contributing sites, and 10 contributing structures. The main dwelling was built in 1853 as a villa or the Big House of the plantation, in an Italianate style. When renovated in 1930, it was transformed when given a Colonial Revival facade to mask decades of deterioration and poor patchwork.

Contributing buildings, many of later construction, include tenant houses, a converted servants quarters (former slave quarters), a garage, a number of barns and sheds, a bowling alley, a smokehouse, and a stable. Contributing structures include three water towers, two well houses, animal feeders, a chicken coop, a silo and a swimming pool. The eight sites include stone foundations or sites of buildings no longer standing. Among these sites are two ruinous barns, a bridge ruin, an old road trace, and remains of landscape terracing. Together they represent the evolution of the Virginia plantation from the mid-19th century to the present day farm.

It was listed on the National Register of Historic Places in 2000.

References

Houses on the National Register of Historic Places in Virginia
Farms on the National Register of Historic Places in Virginia
Historic districts on the National Register of Historic Places in Virginia
Colonial Revival architecture in Virginia
Houses completed in 1853
Houses in Goochland County, Virginia
National Register of Historic Places in Goochland County, Virginia